Presanctified may refer to:
 Divine Liturgy of the Presanctified Gifts, Byzantine Rite liturgical service on the weekdays of Great Lent
 Mass of the Presanctified, Catholic and Anglican liturgy traditionally celebrated on Good Friday

See also
 Sanctification